Julie Beveridge (born 30 June 1988) is a former road cyclist from Canada. She represented her nation at the 2008 UCI Road World Championships and 2009 UCI Road World Championships.

References

External links
 profile at Procyclingstats.com

1988 births
Canadian female cyclists
Living people
Place of birth missing (living people)